Roeurm Channroeurn (born 15 May 1996)  is a Cambodian footballer who plays for National Defense Ministry in the Cambodian League and the Cambodia national team. He made his national debut at the age of 18 on 3 November 2015 in a friendly match against Brunei.

Honours

Club
National Defense Ministry
Hun Sen Cup: 2016

References 

1996 births
Living people
Cambodian footballers
Cambodia international footballers
Association football defenders